Raoul I the Red of Clermont (before 1140 — killed 15 October 1191) was a French nobleman, and Count of Clermont-en-Beauvaisis from 1161 until his death. He was the eldest son of Renaud II, Count of Clermont-en-Beauvaisis, and his second wife (Clemencia de Bar?) and thus a younger half-brother of Marguerite of Clermont.

He was Constable of France from 1174 under Phillip II, King of France.  During the Jacquerie of 1181, he followed the orders of the regent and led the soldiers to secure the abbey of Saint-Leu. He accompanied Phillip in the Third Crusade and died during the Siege of Acre (1189–91).

Raoul married Alix de Breteuil (d. 1196), daughter of Valerian III, Seigneur de Breteuil, and his wife Haldeburge, lady of Tartigny. Raoul and Alix had:
 Catherine of Clermont (d. 1223), married in 1184 to Louis de Blois, Count of Blois and Chartres.
 Aelis (d. before 1182)
 Mathilde, married to William I, Seigneur of Vierzon
 Philippe de Clermont (d. between 1182 and 1192).
Upon his death, his son-in-law Louis became Count of Clermont-en-Beauvaisis.

References

Sources

External links
Prime, Temple, Note on the County of Clermont, Notes Relative to Certain Matters Connected with French History, De Vinne Press, New York, 1903 (available on Google Books)
Clermont-en-Beauvaisis, Encyclopædia Britannica, 11th Edition (archive)

1191 deaths
Christians of the Third Crusade
Counts of Clermont-en-Beauvaisis
Constables of France
Year of birth uncertain